
Gmina Ostrówek is a rural gmina (administrative district) in Wieluń County, Łódź Voivodeship, in central Poland.

Villages
Gmina Ostrówek contains the villages and settlements of Bolków, Dymek, Gwizdałki, Jackowskie, Janów, Kopiec, Kuźnica, Milejów, Niemierzyn, Nietuszyna, Okalew, Oleśnica, Ostrówek, Piskornik, Rudlice, Skrzynno, Wielgie and Wola Rudlicka.

Neighbouring gminas
Gmina Ostrówek is bordered by the gminas of Czarnożyły, Konopnica, Lututów, Osjaków, Wieluń and Złoczew.

References
Polish official population figures 2006

Ostrowek
Wieluń County